Hajj Bahram Mahalleh (also Romanized as Ḩājj Bahrām Maḩalleh; also known as Ḩājjī Bahrām Maḩalleh, Ḩājjī Bahrām and Nāvrūd-e Asālem) is a village in Asalem Rural District, Asalem District, Talesh County, Gilan Province, Iran. At the 2006 census, its population was 174, in 43 families.

References 

Populated places in Talesh County